Vinen is a surname. Notable people with the surname include:

 Joe Vinen (1930–2022), British physicist specializing in low temperature physics
 Richard Vinen, British historian of King's College London

See also
 Vien (name)
 Viner